Night at the Museum is a mixed live action and computer-animated American media franchise of fantasy-comedy films based on the 1993 children's book The Night at the Museum by Milan Trenc, are directed by Shawn Levy and written by Robert Ben Garant and Thomas Lennon. Starring Ben Stiller as a museum night security guard named Larry Daley, the first three films also star an ensemble cast featuring Robin Williams, Owen Wilson, Ricky Gervais, Steve Coogan, Patrick Gallagher, Rami Malek, Mizuo Peck, Mickey Rooney, Bill Cobbs, and Dick Van Dyke, while the video game and fourth film feature a recast ensemble of voice actors.

Films

Night at the Museum (2006)

When Larry Daley (Ben Stiller), a divorced father who was having trouble finding a job, applies for a job at the American Museum of Natural History, he is assigned as a night guard. However, a seemingly easy job turns out to be a wild ride when he finds that an ancient spell has caused the exhibits of the museum to come to life.

Night at the Museum: Battle of the Smithsonian (2009)

Three years after the previous film, several of the exhibits are transferred to the Smithsonian in Washington, D.C., and Dexter the monkey steals the tablet of Ahkmenrah. Larry must break in and team up with his old friends, and new ally Amelia Earhart, to get it back from Ahkmenrah's resurrected evil older brother Kahmunrah before morning.

Night at the Museum: Secret of the Tomb (2014)

Five years after the previous film, Larry discovers that the tablet of Ahkmenrah's magic is failing. He and his now-teenage son Nick, along with Teddy Roosevelt, Sacagawea, Jedediah, Octavius, Dexter, Attila the Hun, and a new caveman figure named Laaa (who looks like Larry) travel to the British Museum in London to undo the curse, with the help of Ahkmenrah's parents and the narcissistic Sir Lancelot of Camelot, before the tablet's magic disappears forever.

Night at the Museum: Kahmunrah Rises Again (2022)

In August 2019, following the purchase of 21st Century Fox and its assets by The Walt Disney Company, Disney CEO Bob Iger announced that a fully animated sequel of Night at the Museum was in development. The project was released as a Disney+ exclusive film, as a production by Walt Disney Pictures.

In October 2020, the movie was officially titled Night at the Museum: Kahmunrah Rises Again. The project is traditionally animated and was scheduled to be released in 2021. The plot centers around Larry's son, Nick, who is hesitant to follow in his father's footsteps as nightwatchman. In addition to Nick and the titular villain, the movie also features returning characters: Jedediah, Octavius, Teddy Roosevelt and Sacagawea with the addition of Joan of Arc. Production began on November 2, 2020. Shawn Levy served as executive producer, but the majority of the original cast were initially not expected to return.

In August 2021, the film was delayed to a 2022 release date. In September 2022, Matt Danner revealed he was directing the film; he previously was the creator and showrunner of the Disney animated show Legend of the Three Caballeros (2018). The film was released on December 9, 2022.

Main cast and characters

Additional crew and production details

Reception

Box office

Critical and public response
The franchise has received mixed reviews from critics.

Video game

In April and May 2009, Night at the Museum: Battle of the Smithsonian – The Video Game, an action-adventure video game adaptation of the feature film of the same name, developed by Amaze Entertainment and Pipeworks Software, was published by Majesco Entertainment to BlackBerry, Wii, Microsoft Windows, Nintendo DS, and Xbox 360. Ben Stiller reprises his role in the film as the voice of Larry Daley.

Stage
In April 2020, Alan Menken revealed that he is working as lyricist and composer for a stage musical adaptation of Night at the Museum. On September 11, 2020, Night at the Museum director Shawn Levy revealed that he is also working on the musical, which has been in development for "a year and a half" by that point. Work on the musical had to be done remotely through Zoom due to the COVID-19 pandemic.

See also
 List of films featuring miniature people

References

Film series introduced in 2006
20th Century Studios franchises
Comedy film series
American fantasy adventure films
Cultural depictions of Theodore Roosevelt
Films about Theodore Roosevelt
Cultural depictions of Attila the Hun
Fiction about neanderthals
Trilogies
Night at the Museum
American Museum of Natural History